Since 1900s, the Central Bank of the United Arab Emirates has minted several commemorative coins. These coins celebrate events, personalities, and rulers of the UAE.

References 

Central Bank of the United Arab Emirates Commemorative Coin Collection
Time Out Abu Dhabi New dirham coin in UAE

United Arab E
Economy of the United Arab Emirates